Tu Tu Main Main (English: Squabble) is an Indian sitcom television sitcom which originally aired on DD Metro and later STAR Plus directed by Sachin Pilgaonkar. The series first premiered on DD Metro in 1994 till 1996 before it moved to Star Plus and the series went on to become the first show to launch the STAR Plus Hindi Band in October 1996.

A sequel series with same themes and extended cast, also directed by Sachin. Kadvee Khattee Meethi aired on STAR One in 2006.

Plot
The story is about the arguments and love and hate between daughter-in-law and mother-in-law. The male lead does a balancing act between mother and wife.

Cast

Main
Reema Lagoo as
 Devki Gopal Verma, Gopal's wife, Ravi and Roopa's mother, Radha's mother-in-law. (Season 1- Tu Tu Main Main)
 Devki Gopal Verma, Gopal's wife, Sooraj's mother, Shalu's mother-in-law, Karan and Arjun's grandmother, Madhu's grandmother-in-law.(Season 2- Kadvee Khatee Meethi)
Supriya Pilgaonkar as 
Radha Ravi Verma (Season 1- Tu Tu Main Main)
Shalu Sooraj Verma(Season 2- Kadvee Khatee Meethi)
Mahesh Thakur as
 Ravi Gopal Verma (Season 1-Tu Tu Main Main)
 Sooraj Verma (Season 2- Kadvee Khatee Meethi)
Kuldeep Pawar as Gopal Verma
 Gopal Verma (Season 1- Tu Tu Main Main)Devki's husband, Ravi and Roopa's father, Radha's father-in-law
 Gopal Verma (Season 2- Kadvee Khatee Meethi)Devki's husband, Sooraj's father, Shalu's father-in-law, Karan and Arjun's grandfather, Madhu's grandfather-in-law.
Ali Asgar as Karan Verma, Shalu and Sooraj's elder son, Gopal and Devaki's grandson, Madhu's husband. He is an insurance agent. (Season 2 - Kadvee Khatee Meethi)
Sucheta Khanna as Madhu Karan Verma, Karan's wife, Sooraj and Shalu's daughter-in-law, Gopal and Devaki's granddaughter-in-law (Season 2 - Kadvee Khatee Meethi)
Swapnil Joshi as Arjun Verma, Shalu and Sooraj's younger son, Gopal and Devaki's grandson. (Season 2 - Kadvee Khatee Meethi)

Recurring
Bhavna Balsavar as Roopa Verma, Gopal and Devaki's daughter, Ravi's elder sister, Radha's friend and sister-in-law.
Sachin Pilgaonkar as Chandan (Season 1 - [Bahu Ka Alternative - Chandan Ki Shaadi])
Resham Tipnis as Guddie (Season 1 - Tu Tu Main Main [Nayi Bahu - Chandan ki Shaadi])
Nayantara as Padma Maasi
Jayati Bhatia as Kumud 
Nirmiti Sawant as Prema Buaji, Gopal's cousin
 Shubha Khote as Bua Ji, Gopal's paternal Aunt(Jeevni Devi)
Surbhi Tiwari as Twins (Shaadi Ke Mehmaan)
 Rita Bhaduri as Radha's mom

Guest appearance
 Sudha Chandran as Sudha: the Dancer
 Nayana Apte as Kalpana Mausi (Saas Sammelan)
Anirudh Agarwal  Dracula Navela

See also
 List of Hindi comedy shows

References

External links
 

Hindi comedy shows
Indian comedy television series
StarPlus original programming
1994 Indian television series debuts
2000 Indian television series endings
Indian television sitcoms
DD Metro original programming